Richard Maloney (born July 21, 1950) is an American football coach.  He is the defensive coordinator and linebackers coach at Augustana College in Rock Island, Illinois, a position he had held since 2018.  Maloney served as head football coach at the University of Chicago from 1994 to 2012. A five-time University Athletic Association (UAA) Coach of the Year, Maloney guided the Maroons to four UAA championships and notched a 94–82 overall record. His .534 winning percentage ranks second all-time at Chicago, trailing only the legendary Amos Alonzo Stagg.  During his tenure, Maloney built a program recognized for not only athletic emphasis but academic excellence.

In 2013, Maloney joined the staff of Rensselaer Polytechnic Institute (RPI) as defensive coordinator and recruiting coordinator. Historically an offensive-minded coach, within two years Maloney built a defensive unit that ranked 13th in total defense nationally.

His 2019 Augustana ToughGuy defense repeated success, like the RPI ones by earning 5 national rankings in the DIII's Top 30.

Head coaching record

References

External links
 Augusta profile
 RPI profile

1950 births
Living people
Albany Great Danes football coaches
Augustana (Illinois) Vikings football coaches
Boston College Eagles football coaches
Boston University Terriers football coaches
Chicago Maroons football coaches
Dartmouth Big Green football coaches
Maryville Scots football coaches
Ottawa Rough Riders coaches
RPI Engineers football coaches
College wrestling coaches in the United States
University of Massachusetts Boston alumni
University at Albany, SUNY alumni